Golap Borbora (29 August 1926 – 19 March 2006) was a chief minister of Indian state of Assam from 1978 to 1979. He was the first non congress chief minister of Assam. Borbora was a member of Rajya Sabha between 1968 and 1974.

Early life
He was born in Golaghat and had his early schooling in Tinsukia and then studied at the University of Calcutta. His parents were Komol Borbora (an executive officer from Indian Oil Corporation Limited, Digboi) and Puniyaprova Borbora. His father later left his job due to official issues (a long strike in the company). He had ten siblings, one of whom was Renu Saikia, who later became famous as a prolific actress in the Assamese film industry.

Personal Background

He was a non-smoker but a "paan and chai addict". He is survived by four sons,including noted advocate Arup Borbora.

Political career
Borbora was a follower of Ram Manohar Lohia and Jai Prakash Narayan and was imprisoned several times during the freedom movement. He had been an active trade unionist from the early days of his political career. He led peasant movements, trade union movements, and went to jail many times. He had been imprisoned nine times in different parts of India since Independence and the last time he was jailed was for 19 months during Emergency. He headed Janata Party Government from March 12, 1978 to September 4, 1979. He succeeded Sarat Chandra Sinha as Chief Minister.

In free India he was arrested in 1975 for opposing Indira Gandhi's regime in the emergency in 1975 and spent 18 months in Tihar Jail. Golap Borbora became the State unit president of the Janata Party in 1977 after his release from Tihar jail and  led the party to victory with 53 seats and was unanimously elected. He was elected the first non-Congress Chief Minister of Assam in 1978.

The Janata Party Government led by Borbora lasted for 18 months only. However, many think that the government did not last long as he had tried to stop influx of illegal immigrants from neighboring countries and also to demonopolize the liquor trade in tea garden belts. His government exempted land revenue for farmers up to 10 bighas and ordered fee exemptions to school students up to HSLC level and all girls up to high school level. The government also introduced free medical treatment in all the government hospitals and allowed free movement of foods-grains within the state.

He died in 2006. He was 83 and was suffering with old age ailments. He spent his last years away from active politics. He was also an office bearer of the North East Frontier Railway Employees' Union  and other labour organisations and was also associated with several social and educational institutions.

Commemorative efforts

As an attempt to commemorate the contributions of Borbora, College Students Welfare Committee, an N.G.O has instituted the C.S.W.C Golap Borbora Scholarship Programme that extends scholarship assistance to meritorious students. The same organisation also hosts the annual C.S.W.C Golap Borbora Memorial Lecture. The organisation is Presided by Mr. Abhinav P Borbora who is the grandson of the former Chief Minister.^^

References

External links 
Former Assam CM Golap Borbora is no more North East News Agency, 1–15 April 2006
Golap Borbora passes away, The Telegraph,  Monday, 20 March 2006
^^

Chief Ministers of Assam
People from Golaghat district
2006 deaths
University of Calcutta alumni
1926 births
Chief ministers from Janata Party
Rajya Sabha members from Assam
Janata Dal politicians
Janata Party politicians
Bharatiya Lok Dal politicians
Samyukta Socialist Party politicians